The 1937 York by-election was held on 6 May 1937.  The by-election was held due to the elevation to the peerage of the incumbent Conservative MP, Lawrence Lumley.  It was won by the Conservative candidate Charles Wood.

References

1937 in England
Elections in York
1937 elections in the United Kingdom
By-elections to the Parliament of the United Kingdom in North Yorkshire constituencies
1930s in Yorkshire